Emma Jane McKenna (born August 18, 1983) is a multi-disciplinary writer. She is currently a PhD Candidate in English and Cultural Studies at McMaster University.  Emma's first book of poetry, Chenille or Silk, was published on March 8, 2019, with Caitlin Press. Her first full-length album as a singer-songwriter, Run With It, was released on June 8, 2010. She was also a founding member of riot grrrl band Galaxy, with Katie Stelmanis and Maya Postepski.

Discography

Galaxy
 I Want You to Notice, 2006

Solo 
 Run With It, 2010
 The Might, 2013
 B-Sides: What it Becomes, 2017

Compilations 
 Friends in Bellwoods II (Happiness), 2009
 Building Blocks (Happiness, Shadows), 2010

References

External links
Emma McKenna on Bandcamp

Canadian LGBT singers
1983 births
Living people